Kay Bailey Hutchison (born Kathryn Ann Bailey; July 22, 1943) is an American attorney, television correspondent, politician, diplomat, and was the 22nd United States Permanent Representative to NATO from 2017 until 2021. A member of the Republican Party, she was a United States Senator from Texas from 1993 to 2013.

Born in Galveston, Texas, Hutchison is a graduate of the University of Texas at Austin. Prior to entering politics, she was an attorney and legal correspondent at KPRC-TV in Houston. She was a member of the Texas House of Representatives from 1972 to 1976. After a brief business career, she returned to politics in 1990, when she was elected Texas State Treasurer. In 1993, she was elected to the United States Senate in a non-partisan special election, defeating Democratic incumbent Bob Krueger and becoming the first female senator in Texas history.

After being re-elected to the Senate in 1994, 2000, and 2006, Hutchison was an unsuccessful candidate for Governor of Texas in 2010, losing the Republican primary to incumbent Rick Perry. Hutchison was the most senior female Republican senator by the end of her tenure in 2013, and the fifth most senior female senator overall. In 2013, she joined the law firm Bracewell & Giuliani.

The downtown Dallas convention center is named after her.

On June 29, 2017, Hutchison was nominated by President Donald Trump to be the next United States Permanent Representative to NATO. She was confirmed by the U.S. Senate in a voice vote on August 3, 2017.

Early life
Hutchison was born Kathryn Ann Bailey in Galveston, the daughter of Kathryn Ella (née Sharp) and Allan Abner Bailey, Jr., an insurance agent. She has two brothers, Allan and Frank. Hutchison grew up in La Marque, Texas.

She received her Bachelor of Arts degree from the University of Texas at Austin in 1962 (age 19). She was also a member of the Pi Beta Phi Sorority. She received her J.D. degree from the University of Texas School of Law in 1967 (age 24). Following her graduation from law school, she was the legal and political correspondent for KPRC-TV in Houston. Hired by Ray Miller, host of the long-running The Eyes of Texas anthology series, Hutchison was among the first on-screen newswomen in Texas.

Early career

In 1972 (age 29), Hutchison was elected to the Texas House of Representatives from a district in Houston. She served until 1976. She was vice-chairman of the National Transportation Safety Board from 1976 to 1978. She was a candidate for the United States House of Representatives in 1982 for the Dallas-based 3rd District, but was defeated in the primary by Steve Bartlett. She temporarily left politics and became a bank executive and businesswoman.

United States Senate

Caucus memberships
 Congressional Oil and Gas Caucus
 Congressional Internet Caucus
 International Conservation Caucus
 Senate Auto Caucus
 Sportsmen's Caucus

Elections

1993

Hutchison was elected Texas State Treasurer in 1990 and served until June 1993 when she ran against Senator Bob Krueger in a special election to complete the last two years of Lloyd Bentsen's term. Bentsen had resigned in January 1993 to become Secretary of the Treasury in the Clinton administration. Krueger had been appointed by Texas Governor Ann Richards to fill the seat until a replacement was elected.

A field of 24 candidates sought to fill Bentsen's unexpired term in the May 1993 special election. The top two vote-getters were Hutchison (593,338, or 29 percent) and Krueger (593,239, also 29 percent). Two conservative Republican congressmen, Joe Barton of Dallas (284,135 or 13.9 percent) and Jack Fields of Houston (277,560, or 13.6 percent) split anti-abortion voters, but even their combined totals, 561,693, would have placed neither in the run-off. A fifth candidate, Democrat Richard W. Fisher, son-in-law of former GOP U.S. Representative James M. Collins, polled 165,564 votes (8.1 percent); the remaining candidates had about 6 percent combined. Running far behind the pack was the Houston conservative political activist and former crusading journalist Clymer Wright, father of his city's 1991 term-limits initiative. Lou Zaeske, an engineer from Bryan, who in 1988 had spearheaded the English-only movement in Texas, polled barely 2,000 votes.

During the campaign Krueger charged that Hutchison was a "country club Republican" and insensitive to the feelings of minorities. In January, the Houston Chronicle reported that both Hutchison and Fields had promised to serve a maximum of two six-year terms in the Senate as part of her support for term-limit legislation for members of Congress. In April, the Dallas Morning News reported that Hutchison had repeated her pledge to serve only two terms in the U.S. Senate, if elected, and had also said term limits ought to cover all senators, including Senator Phil Gramm (Republican), who had been elected in 1984 and re-elected in 1990. (He would stay in the Senate until 2002.) The term-limits legislation never passed, and Hutchison said that she would not leave the Senate in the absence of such legislation, because doing so unilaterally would hurt Texas at the expense of other states in the seniority-driven institution.

After the initial voting, most of the Barton and Fields voters switched to Hutchison, who won the run-off, 1,188,716 (67.3 percent) to 576,538 (32.7 percent). Lower turnout in the run-off resulted in a decrease in Krueger's vote total, by 17,000. Hutchison became the first woman to represent Texas in the U.S. Senate.

Following Hutchison's election in 1993, Texas had two sitting Republican U.S. senators for the first time since Reconstruction, something that would remain through the end of Hutchison's tenure in the Senate.

1993 indictments and acquittal

On June 10, 1993, Travis County authorities, led by Democratic District Attorney Ronnie Earle, raided Hutchison's offices at the State Treasury. The search was conducted without a warrant, as incident to service of the indictments in the case. In September 1993, Hutchison was indicted by a Texas grand jury for official misconduct and records tampering. Hutchison stated that she was the innocent victim of a politically motivated prosecutor. Earle denied that his legal actions against Hutchison were politically motivated. The case against Hutchison was heard before State District Judge John Onion in February 1994. During pre-trial proceedings, the judge did not rule on the admissibility of evidence obtained on June 10. Following the lack of a ruling, Earle declined to proceed with his case. Onion swore in a jury and directed the jury to acquit Hutchison, since Earle chose not to present evidence. The acquittal barred any future prosecution of Hutchison for the same alleged crime.

1994 election

Running in 1994 for election to her first full term, Hutchison received 2,604,281 votes (60.8 percent) to 1,639,615 votes (38.3 percent) cast for Democrat Richard W. Fisher, the son-in-law of the late Republican Congressman James M. Collins, who had also run in the 1993 special election.

2000

In 2000 she defeated Democrat Gene Kelly, with 4,082,091 (65 percent) to 2,030,315 (32.2 percent). She carried 237 of the 254 counties, including one of the most Democratic counties, Webb County (Laredo). This was the only time since the early 1900s that Webb County had supported a Republican candidate for any office on a partisan ballot.

2006

Speculation began in 2004 that Hutchison would run for Governor of Texas in 2006, challenging incumbent Governor Rick Perry in the Republican primary. However, on June 17, 2005, Hutchison announced that she would seek re-election to the Senate instead, reneging on an earlier promise to a two-term limit. Many political analysts speculated that she did not believe she could defeat Perry in the GOP primary because of his popularity among Christian conservatives, while her Senate seat was unlikely to face a serious threat.

Hutchison's Democratic opponent in the November 2006 general election was former Houston attorney and mediator Barbara Ann Radnofsky (born July 8, 1956), who had not previously run for public office. Radnofsky received 44 percent of the vote in the primary, and won a run-off election against Gene Kelly with 60 percent of the vote. Kelly had been the unsuccessful Democratic nominee against Hutchison in 2000. Libertarian Scott Lanier Jameson (born July 1, 1966), a real estate consultant from Plano, also ran for the seat.

Radnofsky faced an uphill battle in a state that has not elected a Democrat statewide since 1994, as George W. Bush's landslide re-election as governor in 1998 had helped carry Republicans into all the other statewide offices. In the August 2006 Rasmussen poll, Hutchison led her opponent by 30 percentage points — 61 to 31. The Survey USA Poll, which is not a head-to-head matchup, but only lists approval ratings of incumbents, found Hutchison with a 61 percent approval rating. The Zogby poll, in contrast, showed a closer result, but still showed Hutchison with an 18.9 percent lead. The authors stated "... Republican Sen. Kay Bailey Hutchison, who got 65 percent of the vote in 2000, is a safe bet to win a third term."

On election night 2006, Hutchison won re-election to another term, winning 2,661,789 votes (61.7%). Radnofsky won 1,555,202 votes (36.04%). Radnofsky only won in base Democratic areas, carrying only border counties with strong Hispanic majorities, such as El Paso and Webb (Laredo) and in Travis County (Austin). Hutchison won everything else, having won majorities in 236 of the state's 254 counties.

2010 gubernatorial election

On August 17, 2009, Hutchison formally announced that she was a Republican candidate for Governor of Texas and positioned herself as a moderate alternative to Governor Rick Perry. Perry criticized Hutchison for her pro-abortion rights position and received endorsements from social conservatives in the state. Although Hutchison led Perry in polls taken in early 2009 and was perceived by many to be the front-runner in the race, by the fall her lead had evaporated and she consistently trailed the incumbent in the final months before the primary. Hutchison accumulated a list of high-profile endorsements that included former U.S. President George H. W. Bush, former U.S. Secretary of State James Baker, former U.S. Vice President Dick Cheney, Hall of Fame baseball player Nolan Ryan, and several current and former congressmen and Cabinet secretaries. However, Hutchison lost the primary to Perry, 31 to 53 percent, with the remainder of the vote going to Debra Medina, a dark horse candidate with ties to the Tea Party movement.

Political positions
Hutchison served on the following Senate committees: Appropriations; Commerce, Science and Transportation; Rules and Administration; Veterans' Affairs. During her time in the Senate, Hutchison was a strong supporter of NASA.

In June 2000, Hutchison and her Senate colleagues coauthored Nine and Counting: The Women of the Senate. In 2004, her book, American Heroines: The Spirited Women Who Shaped Our Country, was published.

From 2001 to 2007, Hutchison served as Vice-Chairwoman of the Senate Republican Conference (caucus), making her the fifth-ranking Republican in the Senate behind Majority Leader Bill Frist, Majority Whip Mitch McConnell and conference chairman Rick Santorum, and Policy Chairman Jon Kyl. In 2007, Hutchison succeeded Jon Kyl as the Policy Chair for Senate Republicans, the fourth-ranking leadership position in the Republican caucus behind Minority Leader McConnell, Minority Whip, and conference chairman Kyl.

The National Journal ranked Hutchison as follows in its 2004 rankings, which are based on various key votes relating to economic policy, social policy, and foreign policy: "Economic: 26% Liberal, 73% Conservative; Social: 38% Liberal, 60% Conservative; Foreign: 0% Liberal, 67% Conservative. In 2012, the National Journal gave her composite scores of 72% conservative and 28% liberal. Although a loyal conservative Republican, she was known to cross over to the other side on a few issues. She was more likely to do this than either Phil Gramm or his successor John Cornyn." A poll that was released on June 19, 2007, showed that Hutchison had an approval rating of 58%, with 34% disapproving.

Supporters of the Tea Party movement have been critical of Hutchison. In 2010, Konni Burton, a member of the Northeast Tarrant Tea Party steering committee, said "She personifies everything that the Tea Party is fighting. She is a Republican, but when you check her votes on many issues, they are not ones that conservatives are happy with."

Hutchison broke ranks with her Republican colleagues and opposed an attempt to stall the Democrats' health-care bill in the Senate.

DREAM Act and immigration
In a letter dated December 9, 2010, Hutchison told some Republicans that she would not support the DREAM Act. Hutchison co-sponsored legislation with Senator Jon Kyl from Arizona to introduce the ACHIEVE Act which they intended to be a compromise proposal. The ACHIEVE Act would not grant a pathway to citizenship; instead it would offer renewable visas to some undocumented immigrants who are Dreamers. Senator Hutchison voted to discontinue funding to 'sanctuary cities,' voted against comprehensive immigration reform, and voted to make English the official language of the United States; she voted against eliminating the 'Y' guest worker visas and voted 'yes' to allowing more foreign workers to work on farms. The American Immigration Lawyers Association, which supports immigration reform, gave her an 80% rating in 2008, and the Federation for American Immigration Reform, which opposes illegal immigration and seeks to reduce legal immigration levels, gave her a 100% rating. Numbers USA, which also opposes illegal and legal immigration, gave her a 76% score.

Abortion
Hutchison has a mixed voting record on abortion rights. In 2012, she said she identifies as "pro-life." She was identified as nominally pro-abortion rights for several years including 2005–2010. She served as an honorary board member of The WISH List, a pro-abortion rights Republican special interest group. She has voted to restrict abortion rights, but has said that she does not favor overturning Roe v. Wade and that the Republican Party should not build its platform around abortion, which she calls a "personal and religious issue." In 1993, Hutchison, then a candidate for the US Senate, identified as "pro-choice" while supporting restrictions on abortion and received campaign contributions from the WISH List. In 1994, Senator Hutchison was one of 17 Republicans who broke with their party to vote in favor of a bill, sponsored by Senator Edward Kennedy, to protect access to abortion clinics by making it a federal crime to block or physically attack the clinics. Also, "Hutchison voted for a 2003 resolution in the Senate stating that the Roe decision 'was appropriate and secures an important constitutional right; and such decision should not be overturned.'" She was one of nine Republicans who joined Democrats to support Roe. Hutchison continued to support abortion rights early in a pregnancy. She said: "I've always said that I think that women should have the ability to make that decision, even if I disagree with it." In June 2004, during the Republican state convention, she told reporters she supported a woman's right to have an abortion early in a pregnancy.

Although she supports the Roe v. Wade decision and legal abortion early in a pregnancy, Hutchison has a "nearly perfect" record of voting in line with the position of anti-abortion interest groups. During her time in the U.S. Senate, Hutchison received consistently high scores from the National Right to Life Committee and consistently low scores from NARAL Pro-Choice America. Hutchison's highest scores from NARAL were a 20% in both 2000 and 2004. In 2005, the Population Institute, which supports voluntary family planning, gave her a 50% score for their positions. In 2008, the pro-abortion rights National Organization for Women gave her a 19% score. Also in 2008, she received a 100% rating for voting in line with the position of Population Action International which advocates for access to family planning services.

DC Personal Protection Act
Hutchison proposed the "District of Columbia Personal Protection Act," which drew 31 cosponsors in the United States Senate, while drawing 157 cosponsors from the House. This bill repealed the handgun bans the city had in place for thirty years. DC's law stated that one could not possess a rifle or shotgun unless it was in disassembled and inoperative form, and could not possess pistols in any form. In 2008, the law was struck down in a U.S. Supreme Court ruling, District of Columbia v. Heller.

Education
Hutchison is a strong supporter of single-sex education in public schools. In 2001, she worked with Senator Hillary Clinton (D-NY) to write provisions into the No Child Left Behind Act (specifically sections 5131.a.23 and 5131c) authorizing single-sex education in public schools. Section 5131c required the Department of Education to write new regulations facilitating single-sex classrooms; this provision led to the publication of new regulations by the Department of Education in 2006 which do in fact facilitate single-sex education in public schools. She is a supporter of the U.S. Public Service Academy.

Embryonic stem-cell research 
In 2006, Senator Hutchison broke with the majority of Republicans and voted in favor of federal funding for embryonic stem-cell research. Hutchison had also signed a letter addressed to President Bush, co-signed by 12 other Republicans, in support of stem cell research in 2001.

Environmental record
In 2005, Hutchison voted against prohibiting oil leasing in Alaska's Arctic National Wildlife Refuge, and has supported legislation promoting drilling in the refuge in 2002 and 2003. In 2005 she also voted against including oil and gas smokestacks in the Environmental Protection Agency's mercury regulations. In 1999, she voted to remove funding for renewable and solar energy, although she has more recently stated she supports the development of alternative energy sources. The League of Conservation Voters gave Hutchison ratings ranging from 0% to 12% during her time in the U.S. Senate.

Earmarks and appropriations
Hutchison supports the practice of earmarking as a way to bring federal government money to her constituents. Hutchison, through her assignment on the Senate's appropriations committee, has been influential in directing federal funds to projects in her state. In FY 2008 and FY 2009, Hutchison sponsored or co-sponsored 281 earmarks totaling almost $500 million. In an interview with the Austin American-Statesman, Hutchison expressed her pride in the practice as a way to, "garner Texans' fair share of their tax dollars."

Hutchison's earmarks and appropriations have been criticized as pork barrel projects or pet projects by the non-partisan government watchdog group Citizens Against Government Waste. CAGW recognized Hutchison's efforts by naming her "Porker of the Month" in October 2009, based on her extensive legislative history, in addition to her request for 149 such pork projects worth $1.6 billion in FY 2010.

Financial reform
Hutchison voted for Senate Republican amendments to the financial reform bill before eventually voting against HR 4173, the Dodd–Frank Wall Street Reform and Consumer Protection Act, on May 20, 2010.

Hutchison voted for the Emergency Economic Stabilization Act of 2008, which authorized the creation of the Troubled Assets Relief Program.

Health care 
Hutchison voted against the passage of Obamacare or the Affordable Care Act. However, Hutchison broke ranks with her Republican colleagues and opposed an attempt to stall the Democrats' health-care bill in the Senate. She was one of three Republican Senators to oppose the filibuster attempt. Hutchison was joined by Republican Senators Susan Collins and Olympia Snowe of Maine. Hutchison was also one of 16 Republican Senators who voted with Democrats to pass the Children Health Insurance Program.

LGBT rights 
Hutchison's campaign said she was opposed to same-sex marriage. In 1996, Hutchison voted for the Defense of Marriage Act banning federal benefits for same-sex marriages. She voted in favor of the Hate Crimes Enhancement Act, which includes sexual orientation, and she co-sponsored the Ryan Act to fund HIV/AIDS services; however, she voted against domestic partnerships in the District of Columbia. In 2004 and 2006, she voted for the Federal Marriage Amendment which was a proposed constitutional amendment to ban same-sex marriage. She voted against later legislation expanding hate crime definitions to include sexual orientation, but did vote against banning affirmative action for federal contractors. In 2009, Hutchison voted for a Defense spending bill that included penalties for people who harm others based on sexual orientation as well as for the 2012 Reauthorizing the Violence Against Women Act which stated that all organizations receiving funds cannot discriminate on the basis of sexual orientation. The Human Rights Campaign, an organization supportive of LGBT rights, gave Hutchison a score of 50%, her highest, from 1993–1994 while she received as low as zero percent in later scores. Hutchison received a 40% from both 1997–1998 and in 2001. In 2010, Hutchison voted against repealing Don't Ask Don't Tell.

Taxes 
As Senator, Hutchison generally favored tax cuts. In 1999, Hutchison supported the "council-led tax cuts" in Washington D.C. Later, in 2001, Hutchison successfully offered a measure to return "$69 billion to the tax cut for marriage penalty relief."

Post-Senate activities

Hutchison announced her intention to resign her Senate post in the autumn of 2009 in order to challenge Texas Governor Perry for the Republican Party nomination. State Republican Chairman Cathie Adams later called upon Hutchison to clarify when she would vacate the Senate so that other Republican candidates could make preparations for their races.

On November 13, 2009, Hutchison announced that she would not resign from the Senate seat until after the March 2, 2010, primary. On March 31, 2010, she announced her intention to serve out her third term.

On January 13, 2011, after some discussion about whether she would change her mind, Hutchison announced she would not seek re-election in 2012.

In 2008, she was mentioned in an article in The New York Times about the women most likely to become the first female President of the United States. On June 22, 2011, Hutchison told Chris Matthews on Hardball with Chris Matthews that she had pondered running for president, but said she could not run in the 2012 election because of the needs of her two 10-year-old children.

In 2012, when she was not seeking re-election, Hutchison endorsed the young Hispanic lawyer Jason Villalba, whom she described at the time as "the future", for the District 114 seat in the Texas House of Representatives vacated by Republican Will Ford Hartnett. Villalba defeated former Representative Bill Keffer, brother of Representative Jim Keffer, in the Republican run-off election. A lawyer for Haynes and Boone in Dallas and a member of the Republican National Hispanic Assembly, Villalba thereafter won the general election and took his seat in January 2013.

In 2013, during the 113th United States Congress, the House of Representatives passed a bill to rename IRC section 219(c) as the Kay Bailey Hutchison Spousal IRA. Getting married women working from home the ability to contribute to IRAs was one of her accomplishments in Congress that she was the most proud of. On July 25, 2013, the bill became Public Law 113-22.

United States Ambassador to NATO

On June 29, 2017, Hutchison was nominated by President Donald Trump to be the United States Permanent Representative to NATO. The U.S. Senate confirmed her nomination by voice vote on August 3. Hutchison was sworn in on August 15 and started the position on August 28.

On October 2, 2018, Hutchison suggested NATO would consider destroying Russian medium-range nuclear systems if Russia continued development on those systems, which would be an act of war under international law.

Personal life
She married her first husband, John Pierce Parks, a medical student, on April 8, 1967; they divorced in 1969. She married her second husband, Ray Hutchison, in Dallas on March 16, 1978. They had two children: Kathryn Bailey and Houston Taylor, both adopted in 2001. She also has two stepdaughters, Brenda and Julie, from her husband's previous marriage. Ray Hutchison was an attorney who served as a Republican in the Texas House of Representatives from 1973 to 1977 and as the chairman of the Texas Republican Party from 1976 to 1977. He died on March 30, 2014, at the age of 81.

Hutchison and her family have their primary residence in Dallas. She had a second house in Virginia, where she lived when the U.S. Senate was in session. In August 2009, she put her Virginia house up for sale, and her campaign stated, "She's no longer going to be in the United States Senate. She's coming home to Texas. That's why it's for sale." She has also purchased a house in Nacogdoches, Texas. She is a supporter of the Multiple Myeloma Research Foundation where she is an honorary board member.

Hutchison is an Episcopalian. She is a member of the Church of the Incarnation, a congregation of The Episcopal Church.

Electoral history

*Lloyd Bentsen resigned his seat to become Secretary of the Treasury; Hutchison won the run-off special election in 1993 to fill out the remainder of his term.

References

External links

 U.S. Senator Kay Bailey Hutchison Archive of official U.S. Senate website
 
 
 Kay Bailey Hutchison  Video produced by Makers: Women Who Make America

|-

|-

|-

|-

|-

|-

|-

|-

1943 births
21st-century American politicians
21st-century American women politicians
American bankers
Episcopalians from Texas
American women lawyers
American women in business
American women journalists
Businesspeople from Texas
Female United States senators
Journalists from Texas
Living people
Republican Party members of the Texas House of Representatives
People from Dallas
People from Galveston, Texas
Permanent Representatives of the United States to NATO
Republican Party United States senators from Texas
State treasurers of Texas
Trump administration personnel
University of Texas School of Law alumni
Women state legislators in Texas
Women financial analysts
People from La Marque, Texas
American women ambassadors
Ambassadors of the United States
Carter administration personnel
Ford administration personnel
American women diplomats